André Nox (1869–1946) was a French film actor.

Selected filmography
 The Jackals (1917)
 Vertigo (1917)
 Sharks (1917)
 The Fugitive (1920)
After Love (1924)
 Count Kostia (1925)
 The Nude Woman (1926)
 The Criminal (1926)
 The Merry Farmer (1927)
 Little Devil May Care (1928)
 Ship in Distress (1929)
 Ecstasy (1933)
 The Tunnel (1933)
 The Call of Silence (1936)
 Nights of Fire (1937)
 Beethoven's Great Love (1937)
 The Citadel of Silence (1937)
 J'accuse! (1938)
 Ultimatum (1938)

References

Bibliography
 Goble, Alan. The Complete Index to Literary Sources in Film. Walter de Gruyter, 1999.

External links

1869 births
1946 deaths
French male film actors
French male silent film actors
20th-century French male actors
Male actors from Paris